Mushleh (also Romanized as Mūshleh, Mīshella, Mīshleh, Mooshleh, and Mūsheleh) is a village in Khomeh Rural District, in the Central District of Aligudarz County, Lorestan Province, Iran. At the 2006 census, its population was 258, in 59 families.

References 

Towns and villages in Aligudarz County